Pu Prefecture or Puzhou may refer to:

Pu Prefecture (Shandong) (濮州), a prefecture between the 6th and 20th centuries in modern Shandong, China
Pu Prefecture (Shanxi) (蒲州), a prefecture between the 6th and 20th centuries in modern Shanxi, China
Pu Prefecture (Sichuan) (普州), a prefecture between the 6th and 14th centuries in modern Sichuan, China

See also
Pu (disambiguation)